King Rodulf was king of the Heruli kingdom on the Middle Danube in the period around 500, and possibly of Scandinavian origin. He died in a battle with the neighbouring Lombards which led to the splitting up of the Heruli. He is probably the same Heruli king that Theoderic the Great wrote to in two surviving letters, in one of which Theoderic "adopted" him with a gift of arms. Less certainly, he is also sometimes equated to a King Rodulf that Jordanes mentions as having come from Scandinavia to Italy, to join Theoderic.

Rodulf was described by Procopius as the king of the Danubian Heruli already three years after the beginning of the reign of Emperor Anastasius (reigned 491-518). Paul the Deacon gave the same name for the Herul king who died when they were defeated by the Lombards, which is normally dated by historians to about 508. After this defeat Procopius reported that while some crossed the Danube into the Roman empire, another part of the Heruli nobility migrated north to the island of Thule (the name Procopius gave to Scandinavia). They passed through the lands of Sclavenes, Warini, and finally the Dani (Danes), before crossing Ocean and settling near the Gauti. He mentions that later generations of Heruli still living near the Danube successfully went to search for royalty in this region in the 540s.

It is uncertain but possible that this Rodulf is the same king of that name who is described in the Getica of Jordanes, as the king of the Ranii on the island of Scandza (what Jordanes called Scandinavia), who left his kingdom near the Danes, and came to Italy, where he succeeded in gaining the "embrace" (gremium) of the Ostrogothic King of Italy, Theodoric the Great. Notably, Jordanes mentions that the Heruli had also been living in this same general area, until they were driven out by the Danes, though his text does not clearly connect this Rodulf to the Scandza Heruli.

The Scandza passage of Jordanes is subject to many different interpretations, and some historians have proposed that Jordanes made errors. For example, Theodor Mommsen believed Jordanes should have described the Scandinavian Rudolf as a Herul, and the historian Herwig Wolfram has described this Scandinavian Rudolf as a Gaut.

Due to the similarity of the circumstances, it has been suggested that the various accounts describe one individual, although this remains uncertain. Historians such as Andrew Merrill have pointed out that the similar elements in the accounts of Jordanes and Procopius may come from a common source, such as Cassiodorus, who worked for Theoderic.

Apart from the name Rudolf, the association with the region of the Dani, their apparent allegiance to Theoderic is notable. 
Another possible record of Rodulf is thus one of the surviving state papers of Theoderic shows that he adopted a Herule king (who is not named in that passage) as a "son in arms". The letter was made during the time of Cassiodorus's public service in the early 6th century, and is dated to 507-511.

More speculatively, another debated issue is whether Rodulf could be the inspiration for certain aspects of later heroic poetry, possibly including the Norse saga character Hrólfr Kraki.

King of the Heruls
The Herul kingdom was centred on Lower Austria and Moravia, north of the Middle Danube. It had existed there since 454, after the Battle of Nedao. Rodulf is the first known king of this kingdom, and the first mention of him which can be associated with a date is the remark of Procopius that implies he was ruling already in the early 490s. This was in the period after Theoderic the Great, took over the Kingdom of Italy from Odoacer. In Italy, Odoacer had been named as a king over the Heruli, and other Danubian peoples who had followed him there. After his murder in 493, the Herules still ruled a kingdom north of the Danube:

Procopius thus sees the conflict with the Langobards starting already in the 5th century, around 494. If however the un-named Herule king who was adopted by Theoderic was Rodulf, based on the idea that there was no Herule king after him who Theoderic would have allied to, then the letter announcing his adoption is estimated to be from 507-511, and the war can not have been earlier than that.

Jordanes also wrote about an unnamed king of the Heruli, who has been identified with Rodulf by some historians. He mentioned that Theodoric adopted a king of the Heruli as his "son in arms," by giving him a horse, sword and shield, probably around 507. The letter to the king, which was to be translated and explained by the envoys, stated that the king would "hold the first rank among the peoples."

After becoming ruler of Italy, Theodoric traveled to what was described as the previous homeland of the Goths, and thereafter, according to historian Herwig Wolfram, wanted to establish an alliance with the Heruli king Rodulf. According to Wolfram, Rodulf "probably included in his sphere of influence the region north of Lake Balaton."

In another letter from the collection of Cassiodorus, probably from between 507 and 514, Theodoric asks for the assistance of the kings of the Heruli, Thuringi and Varni for a counter-attack against the pressure from the Franks. Procopius implied that the battle which led to Rodulf's death took place around 494, it is therefore considered unlikely to have occurred about 508.

A later account of the battle with the Lombards by Paul the Deacon gives Rodulf a more legitimate casus belli against the Lombards. Rodulf purportedly declared war against the Lombards because his brother was murdered by Tato's daughter Rumetruda, after a falling-out between the two, during his brother's return home.

In the Historia Langobardorum ("History of the Lombards"), Paul the Deacon mentions that Rodulf was among the dead in a battle against the Lombards under Tato, probably in 508. Theodoric did not manage to intervene in time, and the Heruls thus suffered a crushing defeat. The Heruls were split up as a result of the defeat in the battle. The Lombards took both Rodulf's standard (vexillum) and his helmet, and Paul the Deacon claimed that this broke the courage of the Heruli such that they never had a king again. However Procopius, who was much closer to the events, notes that the Heruli divided and moved, but still had kings.

King in Scandza

King Rodulf (Roduulf rex) of the Ranii is only mentioned once, in the Getica (De origine actibusque Getarum; "The Origin and Deeds of the Goths") which was written by the Roman historian Jordanes. Although he wrote some generations later, one of his sources was the now lost Historia Gothorum ("History of the Goths") of Cassiodorus, who had written his account at the request of Theodoric the Great, King of the Ostrogoths and ruler of Italy.

In the 19th century, the German classicist Theodor Mommsen argued that the Rodulf of the Ranii tribe and the Rodulf of the Heruli tribe constituted the same person. He proposed that Rodulf could have arrived to Theodoric in 489, when he was in Moesia.

Some modern historians have speculated that it could have been this Rodulf or a similar traveler who provided Cassiodorus or Jordanes with the information for their extensive lists and details of Scandinavian peoples and tribes. In any case, Rodulf was not the only Nordic warlord who visited the Goths and potentially could have provided knowledge about Scandinavian tribes. He probably traveled together with a band of warriors.

In the Getica, it is said that Rodulf spurned and fled his own kingdom, in times which were still recent for Jordanes. The way that his text has come to us, Rodulf is described as king of the "Ranii" who are described as one of several peoples living near the Danes. Jordanes describes him as achieving what he desired from Theoderic. The passage, as translated by Christensen, is as follows:

Modern historians are uncertain whether Jordanes intended to say that Rodulf was king of the Ranii tribe alone, or if he ruled all, or any other of the tribes described in the same context.

Historian Otto J. Maenchen-Helfen, who accepted Mommsen's identification, thought Rodulf should actually be read as king of the Heruli, with a short list of neighbouring tribes have been inserted confusingly, namely the "Granii, Augandzi, Eunixi, Taetel, Rugii, Arochi, Ranii."

In contrast, other historians have proposed that Rodulf had been kings of the list of seven peoples (Granii ... Rani), but most of these can not be identified with any confidence. Since Mommsen's edition of Jordanes, with index notes by Karl Müllenhof, there have been proposals connecting them to Norway. Some modern historians, mostly Norwegian, have continued to make such proposals and imply that Rodulf was a king of all seven of these peoples there. For example, the list has been interpreted as referring to the inhabitants of "Grenland, Halogaland, Telelmark, Ryfylkem, Hordaland, and Ranrike or Romsdal". The vast geographic distances between the tribes, scattered throughout the Norwegian coast, and the unlikeliness of a unified kingdom of such a magnitude at this early point has been cited as an argument against such a possibility.

The name of the Rugii, on the other hand, matches another Middle Danubian people, who were neighbours of the Heruli, and they are thought to have migrated from the Baltic Sea. Historian Axel Kristinsson has speculated that it could have been natural for Rodulf to seek out some of his kinsmen, namely the Danubian Rugians who had joined the Ostrogoths after their kingdom was destroyed in 487.

The scientist-explorer Fridtjof Nansen proposed that "Heruli" at first perhaps was a common name for bands of northern warriors, who to a certain degree consisted of Norwegians. In his book In northern mists, Nansen suggested that Rodulf of the Ranii tribe could have migrated south with a band of warriors, and that on arriving at the Danube, pressed by other warlike tribes in the vicinity, he sought alliance with Theodoric. Nansen believed this could have happened before Theodoric's invasion of Italy in 489, at the same time that the Heruli were just north of the Danube, and were the nearest neighbours of the Goths.

Although particularly German scholarship have identified the unnamed Heruli king and the Rodulfs as the same person, including the Reallexikon der Germanischen Altertumskunde in an entry by Norwegian historian Claus Krag, others such as historian Walter Goffart and archaeologist Dagfinn Skre have questioned at least parts of these identifications.

Historian A. H. Merrills, on the other hand, has proposed the possibility that associating Rodulf with the Scandinavian tribes could have been politically motivated: "The Getica may, of course, be correct in its association of Roduulf with the far north, but the possibility that it merely reflects an ideological distortion should not be overlooked.".

Aftermath
In the early 6th century, the Lombard king Wacho took Silinga as his third wife, who was said to be the daughter of the last king of the Heruls. This has led some scholars to believe that Silinga probably was a daughter of Rodulf. They had the son Walthari. The marriage between Wacho and Silinga functioned to legitimize the Lombards as the successors to the kingdom of the Heruls.

It has been debated whether Rodulf may have influenced later heroic poetry, since the causes of the war between the Lombards and the Heruli (as reported by Paul the Deacon) concerns related issues. Some have furthermore argued that Rodulf could be the background for the character Hrólfr Kraki who appears in the later sagas. Evidence for this includes the significant similarities between the traditions of, on the one side, the Scyldings of the Skjöldunga saga and the Scylfings of the Swedish sagas, and on the other, historical knowledge of the environment around the Heruli, Goths and Huns.

It has also been speculated that the Ráðulfr mentioned in the Rök runestone (which also mentions Theodoric the Great) could be identical with Rodulf.

References

Bibliography

Primary sources
 Cassiodorus, The Letters of Cassiodorus, IV. 2., III. 3.
 Jordanes, The Origin and Deeds of the Goths, 3. 24.
 Paul the Deacon, History of the Lombards, I. XX.
 Procopius, The Wars of Justinian, VI. xiv.

Modern sources

 
 
 
 
 
 
 
 
 
 

 

 
 
 
 
 
 

5th-century births
508 deaths
5th-century rulers in Europe
6th-century rulers in Europe
Norwegian petty kings
Germanic rulers
Germanic warriors
Heruli